VVOB - education for development is a non-profit organisation and was founded in 1982. Commissioned by the Flemish and Belgian governments they contribute to the quality of education in developing countries.

The core of VVOB is technical assistance in projects and programmes carried out in co-management in countries in Africa, Asia and Latin America. They do this with funds from the Belgian and Flemish government, and multiple other donors.

The head office of VVOB is located in Brussels, Belgium. In 2020 VVOB is active in Cambodia, the Democratic Republic of the Congo, Ecuador, Rwanda, South Africa, Suriname, Uganda, Vietnam, Zambia and Belgium.

External links 
 Website VVOB

Non-profit organisations based in Belgium
International development agencies